John Seton or Seaton may refer to:

John Seton, 1st Baron Parbroath (died 1327)
John Seton, Lord Barns (died 1594), Scottish diplomat, courtier and judge
John Seton (priest) (c.1498–1567), English Roman Catholic priest, known as the author of a logic text
Sir John Seton (letter writer), Scottish soldier, correspondent in the 1630s and 1640s
Sir John Seton, 1st Baronet (1639–1686)
John Thomas Seton (c. 1738-1806), Scottish painter
John Seton (MP), member of parliament for Northampton (UK Parliament constituency)
John Seton (musician), Scottish pipe band drum major
John Seaton (footballer), Scottish footballer
John Seaton (cricketer), English cricketer